Bernese German (Standard German: Berndeutsch) is the dialect of High Alemannic German spoken in the Swiss plateau (Mittelland) part of the canton of Bern and in some neighbouring regions. A form of Bernese German is spoken by the Swiss Amish affiliation of the Old Order Amish in Adams County, Indiana, United States, as well as and other settlements in the US, primarily in Indiana.

Varieties 
There is a lot of regional variation within Bernese German dialects. However, with the increasing importance of the big agglomeration of Bern, the variety of Bern is spreading out, levelling the old village dialects.

Until the second half of the 20th century, there was a considerable range of sociolects in the city of Bern where four different groups could be distinguished:

The patrician Bernese German of the high society. It has neither l-vocalisation nor nd-velarisation, it does not employ the alveolar trill but the French uvular trill, and it has more French loanwords than the other varieties.
 The variety of the native city population.
 The varieties of the countryside people who moved into the city.
The variety of the – generally poor – people living in the part of the old town called Matte, known as Mattenenglisch (Matte-English), even though it has little relation with English, but has a number of loans from Jenisch, Rotwelsch and Yiddish. In addition to it, there was also a special kind of Pig Latin which is the proper Mattenenglisch according to some people.

Phonology 

Bernese German is distinguished from other Swiss German dialects by the following characteristics:

The shortening of many high vowels, e.g. Zyt  'time', Lüt  'people', lut  'loud' instead of the long vowel typical in other Alemannic dialects, e.g. Zurich German Ziit , Lüüt , luut  (Standard German Zeit, Leute, laut).
The l-vocalization, e.g. Hauue  'hall', Esu  'donkey' instead of Halle, Esel. This has led to an expanded repertoire of diphthongs and triphthongs, e.g. euter  'older', Seeu  'soul', Schueu  'school'.
The velarization of nd to ng, e.g. angers  'different' (compare Standard German anders). The many words ending with -ng created the joke that Bernese sounds almost like Chinese: Schang gang hei, d Ching wei Hung  'Schang (Jean) go home, the kids want honey(bread)'.

Pragmatics
As in other Western Swiss German dialects and as in French, the polite form of address is the second person plural and not the third person plural as in German.

Grammar
Like other Swiss German dialects, but unlike modern standard German, Bernese German typically keeps the original grammatical gender distinction in the numerals 'two' (2) and 'three' (3):
zwee Manne (two men), masculine
zwo Froue (two women), feminine
zwöi Ching (two children), neuter

... but only 2 words for "three" (3):

drei Manne u drei Fraue (three men and three women)
drü Ching (three children) neuter

Vocabulary 
A lot of the vocabulary known as typical to Bernese German comes from the Mattenenglisch, e.g. Gieu 'boy', Modi 'girl'. The best known shibboleths of Bernese German may be the words äuä 'no way' or 'probably', (j)ieu 'yes', geng (or ging, gäng) 'always'. Bernese typically say mängisch for the German manchmal (sometimes). An often used word at the end of a sentence is a question tag, "gäu" (2nd person singular) or "gäuet" (2nd person plural, polite form) meaning 'isn't it?', whereas other Swiss German dialects prefer "oder", like 'or what?'.

Äuä
Äuä (pronounced , other possible spellings include äuää, äuuä, äuwä, ällwä) is a typical shibboleth of Bernese German. There are two different uses:

 Modal particle: Within a declarative sentence, this word can be used as a German modal particle, connoting that the speaker is only assuming what they are telling, but still quite certain about it. This is very similar to the meaning of the German modal particle wohl. Example:
 .‘(I'm quite certain that) she is going to come soon.’The modal particle is also used in the following sequences of modal particles: äuä scho, äuä de scho. Both sequences give more emphasis to the certainty of the speaker.
Pro-sentence: Like many German modal particles, this word can also be used as a pro-sentence (similar to English words like yes or no). Originally, it was used as an affirmative response with similar connotations to the modal particle. However, this meaning is hardly ever used any more. It is almost exclusively used to give a negative answer connoting subjective disbelief. This meaning has developed from an ironic use. Depending on the intonation, the meaning can vary from very strong disbelief to surprised slight disbelief. Examples:
‘Edmund Hillary was the first to climb Mount Everest without auxiliary oxygen. – No way! Reinhold Messner was the first to do that.’
‘Did you hear? AC/DC split up! – No, really?’

Bernese comedian Massimo Rocchi used äuä as the title for one of his shows, which derives much of its comical effect from the bewilderment an outsider experiences (in this case, Italian-born Rocchi) when first confronted with the idiosyncrasies of Bernese German.

Bernese German literature 
Although Bernese German is mainly a spoken language (for writing, the standard German language is used), there is a relatively extensive literature which goes back to the beginnings of the 20th century.

Bernese German grammars and dictionaries also exist.

Bernese German cinema 
The 2014 film Der Goalie bin ig  (English title: I Am the Keeper), whose dialogue is in Bernese German, was a major winner at the 2014 Swiss Film Awards with seven nominations from which it won four trophies including Best Feature Film. The film, directed by Sabine Boss, was adapted from the novel Der Goalie bin ig by Pedro Lenz (which was translated into Glasgow patter by Pedro Lenz and Donal McLaughlin under the title Naw Much of a Talker). The film played at the Locarno Film Festival in August 2014.

In the 2012 Swiss film, More Than Honey, two Swiss beekeepers describe beekeeping techniques between each other about limiting bee swarms in "As we say in Bernese German: No more beekeeping with a ladder on my back".

Bernese German music 
Many Bernese German songs have become popular all over the German-speaking part of Switzerland, especially those of Mani Matter. This may have influenced the development of Bernese German rock music, which was the first Swiss German rock music to appear and continues to be one of the most important ones.

Today, notable bands singing in Bernese German include Patent Ochsner, Züri West and Stiller Has.

Translations into Bernese German 
 Hans, Ruth und Benedikt Bietenhard: Ds Alte Teschtamänt bärndütsch - en Uswahl. Bern: Berchtold Haller Verlag, 1991.
 Hans und Ruth Bietenhard: Ds Nöie Teschtamänt bärndütsch. Bern: Berchtold Haller Verlag, 1984
 Albert Meyer: Homer Bärndütsch - Odyssee. Muri bei Bern: Edition Francke im Cosmos Verlag, 1960 (weitere Auflagen 1963, 1978, 1988).
 Walter Gfeller: Homer Bärndütsch - Ilias. Bern: Francke Verlag, 1981.
 Walter Gfeller: Vergil Bärndüsch - Aeneis. Bern: Francke Verlag, 1984.
 Antoine de Saint-Exupéry: Der Chly Prinz. Bärndütsch vom Lorenz Pauli. Bern: Lokwort Buchverlag, 2004
 Dominik Meli: Dante Alighieri: Di Göttlechi Komödie. D Höll - Der Lüterigsbärg - Ds Paradys. Bärndütsch. 2021 (academia.edu)

References

Bibliography 
 Otto von Greyerz, Ruth Bietenhard: Berndeutsches Wörterbuch  Bernese vocabulary
 Werner Marti: Berndeutsch-Grammatik  Bernese grammar

External links 
 Baernduetsch Verein – Association for the conservation of Bernese German
 Offizielle Dialekt.ch-Seite zum Bernbiet – Bernese examples in mp3
 berndeutsch.ch Bernese-German dictionary with several thousand words
 my bärndütschi syte – Private homepage with articles, poems and songs in Bernese German
 Berndeutsch – Eine Einführung in die Dialektsprache – Blog Artikel über den Berner Dialekt von Pfüderi

Shibboleths
Swiss German language
Canton of Bern
German dialects